The Coffee County School District is a public school district in Coffee County, Georgia based in Douglas. It serves the communities of Ambrose, Broxton, Douglas, Nicholls, and West Green. The district is a Charter School System and was recognized as Georgia's Charter System of the Year for 2018. It operates eight elementary schools, one middle school, George Washington Carver Freshman Campus, Coffee High School and the Wiregrass Regional College and Career Academy. The vision of the Coffee County Schools is “Creating a Stronger Community through an Equitable and Excellent Education for Every Student”.

Most of Coffee County is in this school district. However there are two separate municipal systems: Elba City School District and Enterprise City School District. Additionally, Fort Rucker residents are within the Department of Defense Education Activity (DoDEA) system instead of the county system, for elementary school. Students on-post in Fort Rucker beyond the elementary level may attend non-DoDEA schools for secondary levels, with an on-post family choosing one of the following three options: Enterprise City, Daleville City School System, or Ozark City Schools.

Schools
The Coffee County School District has eight elementary schools, one middle school, one ninth grade academy and two high schools.

Elementary schools
Ambrose Elementary School
Broxton-Mary Hayes Elementary School
Eastside Elementary School
Indian Creek Elementary
Nicholls Elementary School
Satilla Elementary School
West Green Elementary School
Westside Elementary School

Middle school
Coffee Middle School

High school
Coffee High School
George Washington Carver Freshman Campus
Wiregrass Regional College and Career Academy

References

External links
 
 Coffee County Schools on Facebook

School districts in Georgia (U.S. state)
Education in Coffee County, Georgia